Reverend Oscar Eason Hayes (October 12, 1967 – January 19, 2015), was an American gospel musician and leader of The Abundant Life Fellowship Chorale. He started his music career, in 1991, with the release of Got 2 Tell It by Tyscot Records.  His second album, Simply Determined, was released in 1993 by Tyscot Records, and this was his breakthrough release upon the Billboard magazine Gospel Albums chart. The third release, Choir Music, Vol. 1: Live in New Orleans, came out in 2001 from Sound of Gospel and this placed on the aforementioned chart.

Early life
Reverend Hayes was born on October 12, 1967 in Detroit, Michigan, as Oscar Eason Hayes, whose mother June Hayes, resided in the Northern part of the city, and this caused Hayes to be exposed to a myriad of societal ills. Rev. Hayes graduated from William Tyndale Christian College with his bachelor's degree, while he was in Baton Rouge, Louisiana at A.P. Clay Christian Seminary he graduated with his Master’s and Th.D.

Music career
He began his music recording career in 1991, with the release of Got 2 Tell It on November 26, 1991 by Tyscot Records. His second album, Simply Determined, was released by Tyscot Records on July 26, 1993, and it was his breakthrough release upon the Billboard magazine Gospel Albums chart at No. 27. The third album, Choir Music, Vol. 1: Live in New Orleans, was released on July 31, 2001 by Sound of Gospel, and it placed on the aforementioned chart at No. 19.

Personal life
Reverend Hayes was married to Erica Hayes, at the time of his death on January 19, 2015, and he was the pastor at Nazarene Missionary Baptist Church.

Discography

References

1967 births
2015 deaths
African-American songwriters
African-American Christians
Musicians from Detroit
Songwriters from Michigan
20th-century African-American people
21st-century African-American people